Paul Ulberg (born 14 November 1995) is a Cook Islands international rugby league footballer who plays as a er for the London Broncos in the Betfred Championship.

Background
Ulberg was born in Auckland, New Zealand. He is Cook Islands descent.

Playing career

Club career
He came through the youth system at the New Zealand Warriors, before playing for the Norths Devils, Sunshine Coast Falcons and Wests Panthers in the Queensland Cup.

Ulberg joined London ahead of the 2022 season and was the top try-scorer for the Broncos in the 2022 London Broncos season.

International career
In 2019 Ulberg made his international début for the Cook Islands against South Africa.

Ulberg played for the Cook Islands at the 2019 Rugby League World Cup 9s and was named in the team of the tournament.

In 2022 Ulberg was named in the Cook Islands squad for the 2021 Rugby League World Cup.

References

External links
London Broncos profile
Cook Islands World Cup 9s profile

1995 births
Living people
Cook Islands national rugby league team players
London Broncos players
New Zealand rugby league players
New Zealand sportspeople of Cook Island descent
Rugby league players from Auckland
Rugby league wingers